The GAA & GPA All Stars Young Footballer of the Year (often called the All Stars Young Footballer of the Year, or simply Young Footballer of the Year) is an annual award given at the end of the Championship season to a young footballer aged 21 years or younger who is adjudged to have been the best in Gaelic football.

Winners listed by year

Breakdown of winners

By county

By province

References

External links
 The official website of the Gaelic Players Association

 
 
1997 establishments in Ireland
Awards established in 1997
GAA GPA All Stars Awards